Roentgenium is a chemical element with the symbol Rg and atomic number 111. It is an extremely radioactive synthetic element that can be created in a laboratory but is not found in nature. The most stable known isotope, roentgenium-282, has a half-life of 100 seconds, although the unconfirmed roentgenium-286 may have a longer half-life of about 10.7 minutes. Roentgenium was first created in 1994 by the GSI Helmholtz Centre for Heavy Ion Research near Darmstadt, Germany. It is named after the physicist Wilhelm Röntgen (also spelled Roentgen), who discovered X-rays. Only a few roentgenium atoms have ever been synthesized, and they have no current practical application beyond that of scientific study.

In the periodic table, it is a d-block transactinide element. It is a member of the 7th period and is placed in the group 11 elements, although no chemical experiments have been carried out to confirm that it behaves as the heavier homologue to gold in group 11 as the ninth member of the 6d series of transition metals. Roentgenium is calculated to have similar properties to its lighter homologues, copper, silver, and gold, although it may show some differences from them. Roentgenium is thought to be a solid at room temperature and to have a metallic appearance in its regular state.

Introduction

History

Official discovery
Roentgenium was first synthesized by an international team led by Sigurd Hofmann at the Gesellschaft für Schwerionenforschung (GSI) in Darmstadt, Germany, on December 8, 1994. The team bombarded a target of bismuth-209 with accelerated nuclei of nickel-64 and detected three nuclei of the isotope roentgenium-272:

 +  →  + 

This reaction had previously been conducted at the Joint Institute for Nuclear Research in Dubna (then in the Soviet Union) in 1986, but no atoms of 272Rg had then been observed. In 2001, the IUPAC/IUPAP Joint Working Party (JWP) concluded that there was insufficient evidence for the discovery at that time. The GSI team repeated their experiment in 2002 and detected three more atoms. In their 2003 report, the JWP decided that the GSI team should be acknowledged for the discovery of this element.

Naming
Using Mendeleev's nomenclature for unnamed and undiscovered elements, roentgenium should be known as eka-gold. In 1979, IUPAC published recommendations according to which the element was to be called unununium (with the corresponding symbol of Uuu), a systematic element name as a placeholder, until the element was discovered (and the discovery then confirmed) and a permanent name was decided on. Although widely used in the chemical community on all levels, from chemistry classrooms to advanced textbooks, the recommendations were mostly ignored among scientists in the field, who called it element 111, with the symbol of E111, (111) or even simply 111.

The name roentgenium (Rg) was suggested by the GSI team in 2004, to honor the German physicist Wilhelm Conrad Röntgen, the discoverer of X-rays. This name was accepted by IUPAC on November 1, 2004.

Isotopes

Roentgenium has no stable or naturally occurring isotopes. Several radioactive isotopes have been synthesized in the laboratory, either by fusion of the nuclei of lighter elements or as intermediate decay products of heavier elements. Nine different isotopes of roentgenium have been reported with atomic masses 272, 274, 278–283, and 286 (283 and 286 unconfirmed), two of which, roentgenium-272 and roentgenium-274, have known but unconfirmed metastable states. All of these decay through alpha decay or spontaneous fission, though 280Rg may also have an electron capture branch.

Stability and half-lives
All roentgenium isotopes are extremely unstable and radioactive; in general, the heavier isotopes are more stable than the lighter. The most stable known roentgenium isotope, 282Rg, is also the heaviest known roentgenium isotope; it has a half-life of 100 seconds. The unconfirmed 286Rg is even heavier and appears to have an even longer half-life of about 10.7 minutes, which would make it one of the longest-lived superheavy nuclides known; likewise, the unconfirmed 283Rg appears to have a long half-life of about 5.1 minutes. The isotopes 280Rg and 281Rg have also been reported to have half-lives over a second. The remaining isotopes have half-lives in the millisecond range.

Predicted properties
Other than nuclear properties, no properties of roentgenium or its compounds have been measured; this is due to its extremely limited and expensive production and the fact that roentgenium (and its parents) decays very quickly. Properties of roentgenium metal remain unknown and only predictions are available.

Chemical
Roentgenium is the ninth member of the 6d series of transition metals. Calculations on its ionization potentials and atomic and ionic radii are similar to that of its lighter homologue gold, thus implying that roentgenium's basic properties will resemble those of the other group 11 elements, copper, silver, and gold; however, it is also predicted to show several differences from its lighter homologues.

Roentgenium is predicted to be a noble metal. The standard electrode potential of 1.9 V for the Rg3+/Rg couple is greater than that of 1.5 V for the Au3+/Au couple. Roentgenium's predicted first ionisation energy of 1020 kJ/mol almost matches that of the noble gas radon at 1037 kJ/mol. Based on the most stable oxidation states of the lighter group 11 elements, roentgenium is predicted to show stable +5 and +3 oxidation states, with a less stable +1 state. The +3 state is predicted to be the most stable. Roentgenium(III) is expected to be of comparable reactivity to gold(III), but should be more stable and form a larger variety of compounds. The 6d orbitals are destabilized by relativistic effects and spin–orbit interactions near the end of the fourth transition metal series, thus making the high oxidation state roentgenium(V) more stable than its lighter homologue gold(V) (known only in gold pentafluoride, Au2F10) as the 6d electrons participate in bonding to a greater extent. Moreover, Rg2F10 is expected to be stable to decomposition, exactly analogous to the Au2F10, whereas Ag2F10 should be unstable to decomposition to Ag2F6 and F2. Gold heptafluoride, AuF7, is known as a gold(V) difluorine complex AuF5·F2, which is lower in energy than a true gold(VII) heptafluoride would be; RgF7 is instead calculated to be more stable as a true roentgenium(VII) heptafluoride, although it would be somewhat unstable, its decomposition to Rg2F10 and F2 releasing a small amount of energy at room temperature. Roentgenium(I) is expected to be difficult to obtain. Gold readily forms the cyanide complex , which is used in its extraction from ore through the process of gold cyanidation; roentgenium is expected to follow suit and form .

The probable chemistry of roentgenium has received more interest than that of the two previous elements, meitnerium and darmstadtium, as the valence s-subshells of the group 11 elements are expected to be relativistically contracted most strongly at roentgenium. The compounds AuX and RgX, where X = F, Cl, Br, O, Au, or Rg, were also studied. Rg+ is predicted to be the softest metal ion, even softer than Au+, although there is disagreement on whether it would behave as an acid or a base. In aqueous solution, Rg+ would form the aqua ion [Rg(H2O)2]+, with an Rg–O bond distance of 207.1 pm. It is also expected to form Rg(I) complexes with ammonia, phosphine, and hydrogen sulfide.

Physical and atomic
Roentgenium is expected to be a solid under normal conditions and to crystallize in the body-centered cubic structure, unlike its lighter congeners which crystallize in the face-centered cubic structure, due to its being expected to have different electron charge densities from them. It should be a very heavy metal with a density of around 22–24 g/cm3; in comparison, the densest known element that has had its density measured, osmium, has a density of 22.61 g/cm3. The atomic radius of roentgenium is expected to be around 138 pm.

Experimental chemistry
Unambiguous determination of the chemical characteristics of roentgenium has yet to have been established due to the low yields of reactions that produce roentgenium isotopes. For chemical studies to be carried out on a transactinide, at least four atoms must be produced, the half-life of the isotope used must be at least 1 second, and the rate of production must be at least one atom per week. Even though the half-life of 282Rg, the most stable confirmed roentgenium isotope, is 100 seconds, long enough to perform chemical studies, another obstacle is the need to increase the rate of production of roentgenium isotopes and allow experiments to carry on for weeks or months so that statistically significant results can be obtained. Separation and detection must be carried out continuously to separate out the roentgenium isotopes and allow automated systems to experiment on the gas-phase and solution chemistry of roentgenium, as the yields for heavier elements are predicted to be smaller than those for lighter elements. However, the experimental chemistry of roentgenium has not received as much attention as that of the heavier elements from copernicium to livermorium, despite early interest in theoretical predictions due to relativistic effects on the ns subshell in group 11 reaching a maximum at roentgenium. The isotopes 280Rg and 281Rg are promising for chemical experimentation and may be produced as the granddaughters of the moscovium isotopes 288Mc and 289Mc respectively; their parents are the nihonium isotopes 284Nh and 285Nh, which have already received preliminary chemical investigations.

See also
 Island of stability

Explanatory notes

Citations

General bibliography

External links

 Roentgenium at The Periodic Table of Videos (University of Nottingham)

 
Chemical elements
Chemical elements with body-centered cubic structure
Transition metals
Synthetic elements